Aplyzanzine A is a bio-active isolate of marine sponge.

References

Halogen-containing alkaloids
Bromoarenes
Amides
Dimethylamino compounds